Austin Dion Robbins (born March 1, 1971) is a former defensive lineman in the National Football League who played for the Los Angeles/Oakland Raiders, the New Orleans Saints, and the Green Bay Packers.  Robbins played collegiate ball for the University of North Carolina at Chapel Hill before being selected by the Los Angeles Raiders in the 4th round of the 1994 NFL Draft.  He played professional football for 7 seasons and retired in 2000.

References

1971 births
Living people
Players of American football from Washington, D.C.
American football defensive tackles
North Carolina Tar Heels football players
Los Angeles Raiders players
Oakland Raiders players
New Orleans Saints players
Green Bay Packers players
H. D. Woodson High School alumni